Dhavernas is a surname. Notable people with the surname include:

 Caroline Dhavernas (born 1978), Canadian actress, daughter of Sébastien
 Sébastien Dhavernas (born 1950), Canadian actor